
JoJo's Bizarre Adventure is a manga series written and illustrated by Hirohiko Araki.

JoJo's Bizarre Adventure may also refer to:

Anime
 JoJo's Bizarre Adventure (OVA), an OVA adaptation of Stardust Crusaders produced by A.P.P.P. from 1993 to 2002
 JoJo's Bizarre Adventure (TV series), an anime television series adaptation produced by David Production and screened from 2012
JoJo's Bizarre Adventure (season 1), an anime adaptation of Phantom Blood and Battle Tendency produced by David Production and screened in 2012 to 2013
JoJo's Bizarre Adventure: Stardust Crusaders, an anime adaptation produced by David Production and screened from 2014 to 2015
JoJo's Bizarre Adventure: Diamond Is Unbreakable, an anime adaptation produced by David Production and screened in 2016
JoJo's Bizarre Adventure: Golden Wind, an anime adaptation by David Production and screened in 2018 and 2019
JoJo's Bizarre Adventure: Stone Ocean, an anime adaptation screened in 2021 and 2022.

Film
 JoJo's Bizarre Adventure: Phantom Blood (film), a 2007 film
 JoJo's Bizarre Adventure: Diamond Is Unbreakable Chapter I, a 2017 film

Video games
 List of JoJo's Bizarre Adventure video games
 JoJo's Bizarre Adventure (video game), a 1998 video game
 JoJo's Bizarre Adventure: All Star Battle, a 2013 video game, made for PS3
 JoJo's Bizarre Adventure: Eyes of Heaven, a 2016 video game, made for PS4